The 2004 Three Days of De Panne was the 28th edition of the Three Days of De Panne cycle race and was held on 30 March to 1 April 2004. The race started in Middelkerke and finished in De Panne. The race was won by George Hincapie.

General classification

References

Three Days of Bruges–De Panne
2004 in Belgian sport